Liu Yunhong (born 13 January 1959) is a Chinese foil and sabre fencer. He competed at the 1984 and 1988 Summer Olympics.

References

External links
 

1959 births
Living people
Chinese male foil fencers
Olympic fencers of China
Fencers at the 1984 Summer Olympics
Fencers at the 1988 Summer Olympics
Asian Games medalists in fencing
Fencers at the 1986 Asian Games
Asian Games silver medalists for China
Medalists at the 1986 Asian Games
Chinese male sabre fencers
20th-century Chinese people